Tim Morrison  or Timothy Morrison may refer to:

Tim Morrison (American football) (born 1963), American professional football player
Tim Morrison (presidential advisor) (born c. 1978), American political adviser